C.C. Hubbard High School, also known as Lincoln School and Lincoln-Hubbard School , is a historic high school located at Sedalia, Pettis County, Missouri.  It was built in 1928, and is a two-story, symmetrical brick building.   Projecting wings were added in 1952 to house a cafeteria and an industrial arts classroom. It is the last remaining building in Sedalia, Missouri, to be built and used as a separate school for African-American students. The composer and music educator L. Viola Kinney taught music and English at the school for 35 years.  The school closed in 1962. The former school has been renovated as an apartment building.

It was listed on the National Register of Historic Places in 1997.

References

African-American history of Missouri
High schools in Missouri
School buildings on the National Register of Historic Places in Missouri
School buildings completed in 1928
Buildings and structures in Pettis County, Missouri
National Register of Historic Places in Pettis County, Missouri
1928 establishments in Missouri